Mayview is an unincorporated community in Champaign County, Illinois, United States. Mayview is located along U.S. Route 150, east of Urbana.

References

Unincorporated communities in Champaign County, Illinois
Unincorporated communities in Illinois